Ruellia nudiflora, the violet wild petunia, is a perennial plant in the acanthus family (Acanthaceae) found in areas of moisture in the Sonoran Desert. Despite its name, it is not a true petunia.

References

External links

nudiflora